Şollar (also, Shollar) is a village and municipality in the Khachmaz Rayon of Azerbaijan.  It has a population of 1,433.  The municipality consists of the villages of Şollar and Çaxçaxlı.

References 

Populated places in Khachmaz District